L'Europe galante (Galant Europe) is an opéra-ballet in a prologue and four entrées by André Campra to a French libretto by Antoine Houdar de la Motte.

The opera is regarded as the first opéra-ballet, with the entrées sharing a common theme – in this case 'love' in four countries, France (entrée 1), Spain (entrée 2), Italy (entrée 3) and Turkey (entrée 4) – rather than a common narrative.

Performance history
L'Europe Galante was first performed on 24 October 1697 by the Paris Opéra under Marin Marais in the Salle du Palais-Royal in Paris. It was successful and was revived periodically until 1775. In 1997 – on the 300th anniversary of its creation – Istanbul Baroque led by Leyla Pınar staged L'Europe Galante in Istanbul Dolmabahçe Palace. They then toured it to the Brussels Printemps baroque du Sablon festival the same year.

Roles

Sources

Further reading
Anthony, James R. (1992), "Europe galante, L" in The New Grove Dictionary of Opera, ed. Stanley Sadie (London)

External links

Opéras-ballets
Operas by André Campra
French-language operas
Operas
Opera world premieres at the Paris Opera
1697 operas